"Burn in Hell" is a song and the first single to be released by English heavy metal band Judas Priest in 1997 for their 13th studio album Jugulator. The song is about the evils that humans do and is featured on the two live albums '98 Live Meltdown and Live in London, both of which were recorded with Tim "Ripper" Owens. The single is also Judas Priest’s first with Owens.

A music video was produced for the song. It was shortened down to a little over four minutes. The video features the band in their stage attire playing the song on a stage with fast camera changes and different lights.

Personnel
Tim "Ripper" Owens – Vocals
K. K. Downing – Guitars
Glenn Tipton – Guitars
Ian Hill – Bass
Scott Travis – Drums

Judas Priest songs
1997 songs
Songs written by K. K. Downing
Songs written by Glenn Tipton